Clara Mayte Brito Medina is a Dominican model and beauty pageant titleholder who was crowned Miss Earth Dominican Republic 2014 and will represent her country in the Miss Earth 2014 pageant.

Pageantry

Miss Dominican Republic 2010
Mayté joined Miss Dominican Republic 2010 when she was eighteen years old. She represented her hometown, the San Cristóbal Province. At the conclusion of the pageant, she placed as fourth runner up, earning the right to compete at Miss Global Teen 2010 which she later won.

The pageant was won by Eva Arias of Espaillat.

Miss Mundo Dominicana 2014
Brito competed in Miss Mundo Dominicana 2014 where she competed to succeed Joely Bernat as the Dominican Republic's representative to Miss World and finished as 2nd Runner-Up, gaining the right to succeed Cheryl Ortega as Miss Tierra República Dominicana pageant. Mayte was original expected to compete a year after her coronation in 2015 however weeks after her victory Cheryl Ortega withdrew due to her studies. Since Mayté is Cheryl's successor, she became Cheryl's replacement for 2014.

Miss Earth 2014
By winning Miss Earth Dominican Republic title, Mayté will flew to the Philippines in November where she competed succeed Alyz Henrich as Miss Earth but failed to place in the semi-finals.

References

External links
 Miss Earth official website

Living people
Miss Earth 2014 contestants
Dominican Republic beauty pageant winners
1990s births